Malika Parbat (Pashto/; Queen of the Mountains) (el. ) is the highest peak in Kaghan Valley, Khyber Pakhtunkhwa, Pakistan.

The mountain is clearly visible from the popular tourist spot of Lake Saiful Maluk in Kaghan Valley. Malika Parbat is accessible from Naran-Lake Saiful Muluk side and from Batakundi-Dadar Chitta glacier. There are three summits that form Malika Parbat:  Malika Parbat (North Peak), Malika Parbat Cresta, and Malika Parbat (South Peak). There are other peaks which offer considerable climbing difficulty in Siran Basin, Khabanar Valley and Burji Valley, while from Burawai, another cirque of low peaks is equally good for mountaineering.

Climbing history 

Only twelve climbers have reached the top of Malika Parbat (North Peak) until now. The North Summit was firstly reached by Captain B.W. Battye and four Gurkha soldiers in 1920 followed by a second ascent made by Trevor Braham, Norman Norris and Gene White in 1967.

In 1998, two Pakistanis, Rashid Butt and Omer Aziz climbed the Malika Parbat Main Peak. Rashid Butt lost his life while descending down the sheer slopes on South Peak. In August 2012, an expedition of four members led by Ahmed Mujtaba Ali (Pakistan) reported to Summit the Malika Parbat. Other members of the expedition were Ahmed Naveed, Kamal Haider and Saqib Ali. The two mountaineers reached . By then, clouds had gathered and a hail storm followed. Malika Parbat is considered to be the most technical peak above 5,000 metres.

Imran Junaidi is the first Pakistani to have climbed the North peak. The mountain is considered non-climbable among the local population due to steepness and other mountain as well as supernatural hazards. The five-day climbing expedition was initiated as a part of both climbers for expressing the growing friendship between Denmark and Pakistan. This expedition is not only the first ever joint Pakistan-Danish climbing expedition, but it is also the first ever Pakistani ascent of the North Peak.

Danish climber and also Deputy Head of Mission at the Danish Embassy in Islamabad, Jens J. Simonsen stated upon his return that “It was really important for me to do this ascent with a Pakistani climber, not only as an expression of my friendship with Pakistani climbers, but also as a small concrete expression of the friendship between Denmark and Pakistan.” “Pakistan is a country of so many strengths and beautiful natural resources, which is breathtaking, especially for us who come from abroad and knew very little about Pakistan. Our relations have never been stronger and we would like to continue working together and extend Pakistan the support it needs to grow and prosper,” he said. The mountain is however, considered non-climbable among the local population due to steepness and other mountain hazards. Pakistani climber of the two-man team, Imran Junaidi also shared that he was extremely happy to have taken on this challenge and to have climbed together with his Danish friend and climber, Simonsen. “The climb was no doubt quite challenging at times, but sometimes you have to fight a little for your friendships and for your dreams.”

See also 

 Musa ka Musalla
 List of mountains in Pakistan
 List of the highest mountains in the world

References

External links 
 Northern Pakistan detailed placemarks in Google Earth
 A big picture of this dangerous peak

Himalayas
Mountains of Khyber Pakhtunkhwa